Pateobatis is a genus of stingrays in the family Dasyatidae from the Indo-Pacific. Its species were formerly contained within the genus Himantura.

Species
Pateobatis bleekeri (Blyth, 1860) (Bleeker's whipray) 
Pateobatis fai (Jordan & Seale, 1906) (Pink whipray)
Pateobatis hortlei (Last, Manjaji-Matsumoto & Kailola, 2006) (Hortle's whipray)
Pateobatis jenkinsii (Annandale, 1909) (Jenkins' whipray)
Pateobatis uarnacoides (Bleeker, 1852) (Whitenose whipray)

References

Dasyatidae
Taxa named by Peter R. Last 
Taxa named by Gavin J.P. Naylor
Taxa named by Bernadette Mabel Manjaji-Matsumoto